Juan Alexis Ribera Castillo (born 13 August 1995), better known as Alexis Ribera, is a Bolivian professional footballer who plays for Oriente Petrolero  in the Bolivian Primera División.

On 28 May 2018, he started for the Bolivia national football team against the United States national team in Pennsylvania.

References

External links

1995 births
Living people
Bolivian footballers
Association football midfielders
Bolivia international footballers
Oriente Petrolero players